Thomas Terry Connally (August 19, 1877October 28, 1963)  was an American politician, who represented Texas in both the U.S. Senate and the House of Representatives, as a member of the Democratic Party. He served in the U.S. House of Representatives from 1917 to 1929, and in the U.S. Senate from 1929 to 1953.

Connally led the opposition to federal anti-lynching legislation in the late 1930s, filibustering the Anti-Lynching Bill of 1937. He advocated in favor of Jim Crow laws, for example opposing equal education for black people. In the House, Connally was a staunch Wilsonian Democrat who campaigned in favor of the League of Nations, and the World Court. In the Senate, he chaired the Committee on Foreign Relations from 1941, giving strong support to President Franklin Roosevelt's anti—German and anti-Japanese policies. He worked with Republican Senator Arthur H. Vandenberg to ensure bipartisan support for an internationalist policy, including the new United Nations. He led the committee in supporting the Truman Doctrine in 1947, the Marshall Plan in 1948 and NATO in 1949.

Early life and education
Connally studied at Baylor University and earned his A.B. in 1896. He later attended the University of Texas School of Law, earning his LL.B. in 1898. While there, Connally was a close friend of future Governor of Texas Pat Neff and future United States Senator Morris Sheppard. After earning his law degree, he enlisted in the 2nd Texas Volunteer Infantry to fight in the Spanish–American War. After the end of the war, he established a law firm in Marlin, Texas, where he worked until his entry into politics.

Political career

Connally ran unopposed and was elected to the Texas House of Representatives in 1900 and 1902. During his tenure in the Texas House he was a prominent opponent of monopolies and co-authored the Texas Anti-Trust Law of 1903. After 1904, he left state politics to pursue his legal career, and served as the prosecuting attorney for Falls County from 1906 to 1910. In 1916, he made his first foray into national politics by running for the vacant House seat for the 11th Congressional District of Texas. After resigning his office to fight in World War I, Connally returned to the House where he served on the House Committee on Foreign Affairs and worked against isolationist policies.

In 1928 Connally was elected to the U.S. Senate. During his time in the Senate he supported Roosevelt's New Deal legislation through the passage of the Connally Hot Oil Act of 1935, which attempted to circumvent the Supreme Court of the United States' rejection of a key part of New Deal legislation.

During most of his tenure in the Senate Connally was a member of the Senate Foreign Relations Committee, and served as chairman from 1941 to 1947, and 1949 to 1953. As Chairman of the Senate Foreign Relations Committee, he was instrumental in the ratification of the treaty creating the North Atlantic Treaty Organization.

He was also a member and vice-chairman of the United Nations Conference on International Organization in 1945 that chartered the United Nations. He authored the noted "Connally Amendment," which amended the U.S. ratification of the U.N. charter to bar the International Court of Justice from having jurisdiction over domestic matters '"as determined by the United States"'.

On October 20, 1951, when General Mark Wayne Clark, an Episcopalian whose mother was Jewish, was nominated by President Harry Truman to be the U.S. emissary to the Holy See, Connally protested against the decision on the basis that Clark was alleged to have caused a large number of needless deaths at the Battle of Rapido River. Clark later withdrew his nomination on January 13, 1952.

In 1953, Connally retired from the Senate, ending his career in national politics.

Role as chairman of the Foreign Relations Committee
In 1943 a confidential analysis by British scholar Isaiah Berlin of the Senate Foreign Relations Committee for the British government characterized Senator Connally:
The chairman of the Committee, Tom Connally of Texas, is a very typical, exuberant Southern figure with the appearance and mannerisms of an old-fashioned actor and a gay and hearty manner which conceals lack both of strength and of clear public principles. He is normally the spokesman of the Administration and, in particular, of the Department of State. His voting record is that of a straight interventionist. His principal point of deviation from [Secretary of State] Hull's policies is the subject to which Mr. Hull has dedicated a large portion of his life, namely, the policy of reciprocal trade. Representing as he does, a great cattle breeding State, his enthusiasm for free trade with, e.g., the Argentine, is not ardent. He has been a solid supporter of the department's policies toward, e.g., France and North Africa. His support of its economic policies is regarded as doubtful. On internal issues he shares all the beliefs and prejudices of the South.

During his time in office, Senator Connally also served as the first delegate from the United States to the United Nations First Committee, known at the time in 1946 as The Political and Security Committee. Meetings of the First Committee were held from October to December 1946 in the village of Lake Success in New York. Mr. Connally was the first to move for the recommendation to the General Assembly to accept the applications of Afghanistan, Iceland, and Sweden, after they had been approved by the Security Council.

Personal life
Connally's first wife was Cincinnati Conservatory-trained vocalist Louise Clarkson of Marlin, Texas, who died in her husband's Senate office of a sudden heart attack in 1935. The couple had one son, Houston attorney Ben Clarkson Connally, a U.S. district judge. Connally later married Lucile Sanderson Sheppard, the widow of his former Senate colleague, Morris Sheppard of Texarkana, Texas.

Death
Tom Connally died of pneumonia on October 28, 1963. He is buried in Calvary Cemetery in Marlin, Texas, next to his first wife.

References

 
 Time magazine: Sept. 5, 1960

Further reading
 Connally, Tom and Alfred Steinberg. My Name is Tom Connally (1954)
 Grant, Philip A. "Roosevelt, the Congress, and the United Nations." Presidential Studies Quarterly 13.2 (1983): 279–285.
 Heineman, Kenneth J. "Asserting states’ rights, demanding federal assistance: Texas Democrats in the era of the New Deal." Journal of Policy History 28.2 (2016): 342–374.
 Hill, Thomas Michael. "Senator Arthur H. Vandenberg, the Politics of Bipartisanship, and the Origins of Anti-Soviet Consensus, 1941–1946." World Affairs 138.3 (1975): 219–241.  Online
 Porter, David L. The Seventy-sixth Congress and World War II, 1939–1940 (1979).
 Williams, Phil.  The Senate and US Troops in Europe (Palgrave Macmillan, 1985), excerpt  chapter on "The North Atlantic Treaty, Military Assistance and the Troops to Europe Decision."  pp. 11–41.

1877 births
1963 deaths
People from McLennan County, Texas
Baylor University alumni
Texas lawyers
People from Marlin, Texas
Democratic Party members of the Texas House of Representatives
Democratic Party United States senators from Texas
Democratic Party members of the United States House of Representatives from Texas
Chairmen of the Senate Committee on Foreign Relations
University of Texas School of Law alumni
20th-century American politicians
History of racism in the United States
American white supremacists
Internationalism